Violanta is a 1942 German drama film directed by Paul May and starring Annelies Reinhold, Richard Häussler, and Hans Schlenck. It is based on a novel by Ernst Zahn which had previously been turned into a silent film in 1928.

Location filming took place around Kufstein in Tyrol.

Cast

References

Bibliography

External links 
 

1942 films
1942 comedy films
German comedy films
Films of Nazi Germany
1940s German-language films
Films directed by Paul May
German black-and-white films
Remakes of German films
Sound film remakes of silent films
UFA GmbH films
1940s German films